Ancient Thunder is a children's fantasy picture book by the Canadian artist and writer Leo Yerxa, simultaneously published in Canada and the United States in 2006. It won the 2006 Governor General's Award for Children's Illustration and the 2008 Saskatchewan Willow Award for picture books. Ancient Thunder was both illustrated and written by Leo Yerxa.

Summary 
This book describes the relationship of horses and First Nation's cultures with a single poem and illustrations using water-colour artwork. Only few lines of text per page contrast with painted images associated with native culture.

Concept and development 
Yerxa was interested by the native people while he watched them ride across the Great Plains in the movie when he was a child, their traditional clothing and the running creatures inspired Yerxa to write this book. He used handmade water-colour paper and made it look like leather.

Awards

References
2006 children's books
Canadian children's books
Canadian picture books
Horses in literature

External links
The 2008 Willow Awards
First Nation Communities Read at the Canadian Children's Book Centre
Past GG – Leo Yerxa at Canada Council for the Arts
Ancient Thunder at IndieBound
Book review: "(Re)presenting Cultures" by Suzanne James in Canadian Literature: A Quarterly of Criticism and Review, Autumn 2007, pg. 188–189
Children's Book Review:Ancient Thunder in Publishers Weekly